The Enforcer is a 2022 American action thriller film directed by Richard Hughes, starring Antonio Banderas, Kate Bosworth and Mojean Aria.

Cast
 Antonio Banderas as Cuda
 Kate Bosworth as Estelle
 Mojean Aria as Stray
 Alexis Ren as Lexus
 Zolee Griggs as Billie
 2 Chainz as Freddie
 Mark Smith as Doom
 Luke Bouchier as Paycheck
 Aaron Cohen as Joe
 Kika Georgiou as Medina
 Kostas Sommer as Ronnnie Fedec
 Christos Vasilopoulos as Silvio
 Vivian Milkova as Lola
 Natalie Burn as Olivia

Release
The film premiered in select theatres and On Demand in the United States on 23 September 2022.

Reception
Dennis Harvey of Variety called the film "stylish but shallow" and praised the performance of Banderas. Dustin Chase of The Daily News graded the film a "D-" and called it a "cheap film that never tries to make the most of a limited budget." Tara McNara of Common Sense Media rated the film 2 stars out of 5 and wrote that while it "isn't a great film by any stretch of the imagination", it has "exciting" adjustments and has "some heart".

Sumner Forbes of Film Threat gave the film a score of 5.5/10 and wrote that it "struggles to set itself apart from the crowded pack." Julian Roman of MovieWeb wrote that the film "surpasses typical genre films with a modicum of depth."

References

External links
 
 

American action thriller films
2022 action thriller films